A Certain Magical Index is a Japanese anime television series produced by J.C.Staff and directed by Hiroshi Nishikiori, which is based on the light novel of the same name. The story follows the adventures of Toma Kamijo, a high school student in the scientific-advanced Academy City whose right hand contains a unique power called "Imagine Breaker", and Index, a young nun from the Church of England whose mind has been implanted with 103,000 grimoires of the Index Librorum Prohibitorum. The series broadcast 74 episodes over three seasons.

The first season aired on Chiba TV on October 4, 2008, and later on AT-X on January 8, 2009, upon the release of episode 14, until March 19, and consisted of twenty-four episodes. It adapts the first six volumes of the light novel. The second season aired from October 8, 2010, to April 1, 2011, and consisted of twenty-four episodes. It adapts the seventh to the thirteenth volume of the light novel. The third season aired from October 5, 2018, to April 5, 2019, and consisted of twenty-six episodes. It adapts the final nine volumes of the light novel. All three seasons are available on Blu-ray and DVD, as well as on streaming services.

Series overview

Episode list

Season 1 (2008–2009)

Season 2: II (2010–2011)

Season 3: III (2018–2019)

Original video animation

A Certain Magical Index-tan
 is an original video animation series included in the Japanese release of the first and fifth Blu-ray and DVDs of each season of A Certain Magical Index, which features a chibified Index and parodies of events that take place in the series.

Notes

References

External links
 
 

Certain Magical Index, A
A Certain Magical Index